Mordellistena gracilis is a beetle in the genus Mordellistena of the family Mordellidae. It was described in 1908 by Friedrich Julius Schilsky.

References

gracilis
Beetles described in 1908